Commandant Rivière (F 733) was a Commandant Rivière-class frigate of French Navy.

Development and design 

The main gun armament of the Commandant Rivière class consisted of three of the new French  guns, with a single turret located forward and two turrets aft. These water-cooled automatic dual-purpose guns could fire a  shell at an effective range of  against surface targets and  against aircraft at a rate of 60 rounds per minute. Two triple torpedo tubes were fitted for anti-submarine torpedoes, while the ship's armament was completed by two 30 mm Hotchkiss HS-30 cannon. The ships had accommodation for an 80-man commando detachment with two fast landing boats, each capable of landing 25 men.

Construction and career 
Commandant Rivière was laid down in April 1957 and launched on 11 October 1958 at Arsenal de Lorient in Lorient. The vessel was commissioned on 4 December 1962.

In 1984–1985, Commandant Rivière was converted to a sonar-trials ship. The ship's armament was replaced by a single 40 mm Bofors gun and two 12.7 mm machine guns, while the ship's stern was rebuilt to accommodate a hoist for a variable depth sonar, which was used to test various active and passive towed array sonars.

She served as a breakwater in Saint-Mandrier from 1993 to 2009 after decommissioning in 1992. She awaited dismantling in Toulon from 2009 to 2014 and dismantled in Ghent in 2015.

References

1958 ships
Commandant Rivière-class frigates